Diderma effusum is a species of slime mould in the family Didymiaceae, first described by Lewis David de Schweinitz in 1832 as Physarum effusum, and transferred to the genus, Diderma, in 1894 by Andrew Price Morgan.  It is found throughout the world, It feeds on nonliving organic matter.

Description
Andrew Price Morgan describes it thus:

References

External links 
Description of Diderma effusum at DiscoverLife
Images of Diderma effusum at iNaturalist

Myxogastria
Taxa described in 1832
Taxa named by Lewis David de Schweinitz